The 2011 IAAF Race Walking Challenge was the 9th edition of the annual international race walking competition organised by the International Association of Athletics Federations (IAAF). Ten meetings were scheduled for the competition: the race walk events at the 2011 World Championships in Athletics, five IAAF permit meetings, and four area permit meetings.

Athletes who gained enough points from competing at these meetings were entered into the IAAF Race Walking Challenge Final, where they competed for a total pot of US $200,000 in prize money. Reigning Olympic champions Valeriy Borchin and Olga Kaniskina won the final race and the series.

Calendar
The following ten meetings, as well as the competition final, formed the schedule of the 2011 Race Walking Challenge. The "A" category meetings are worth the most points, with progressively fewer points being available through the "B" and "C" categories.

Winners

References

External links
Official homepage from IAAF
Past winners from GBR Athletics
Competition archive from IAAF

World Race Walking Challenge
World Athletics Race Walking Tour